Uštipci are doughnut-like fried dough balls popular in Southeast European countries, namely Bosnia and Herzegovina, Croatia, North Macedonia, Serbia, Slovenia and Albania

Origin

The origin of the uštipci pastry is unknown. The word uštipci comes from the verb uštinuti, which can be translated as "to nip, tweak or pinch".

In Bosnia and Herzegovina, it is occasionally referred to as peksimeti. In Croatia, a variant of the dish known as fritule is also made; the two names are commonly used interchangeably for both dishes. In Slovenia, a variant of the dish similar to fritule is called miške.

Description
They are similar to fritule and also krofne but with more of a soft, bread-like feel. Unlike other dishes from the region, such as krofne,  they do not necessarily have to be sweet. In restaurants, they might come with jam, kajmak or with cheese thus fulfilling the role of breakfast staple, dessert, or even a main course. They can also have other ingredients in them which most commonly are apple, pumpkin, but even meat and cheese are possibilities. They are eaten with tea or coffee and also as a dessert. They are also often served with powdered sugar sprinkled on top to make them more aesthetically pleasing. They can go well with jams, Nutella, and Eurocrem.

Preparation
In a large bowl, add flour and yeast, and then mix. Then, add salt and sugar, egg, and water until the mixture is at a dough-like consistency. Leave to stand for about half an hour until the dough sets. Once the dough has doubled in size, pinch medium-sized pieces of dough in any shape you like and place them in a pan with a good amount of oil, usually filled to half to the top. Fry until just golden brown. Place on paper towel to dry excess oil.

References

Bosnia and Herzegovina cuisine
Croatian pastries
Serbian cuisine